Old or OLD may refer to:

Places 
Old, Baranya, Hungary
Old, Northamptonshire, England
Old Street station, a railway and tube station in London (station code OLD)
OLD, IATA code for Old Town Municipal Airport and Seaplane Base, Old Town, Maine, United States

People 
Old (surname)

Music
OLD (band), a grindcore/industrial metal group
Old (Danny Brown album), a 2013 album by Danny Brown
Old (Starflyer 59 album), a 2003 album by Starflyer 59
"Old" (song), a 1995 song by Machine Head
Old LP, a 2019 album by That Dog

Other uses
Old (film), a 2021 American thriller film
Oxford Latin Dictionary
Online dating
Over-Locknut Distance (or Dimension), a measurement of a bicycle wheel and frame
Old age

See also
List of people known as the Old

Olde, a list of people with the surname
Olds (disambiguation)